= Town of Masoudieh =

Town of Masoudieh Persian: شهرک مسعودیه
- town
- Interactive map of Town of Masoudieh
- Country: Iran
- City: Tehran
- Founded: 1978
- Population: 74500
- Phone code: 021-33
- Website: region15.tehran.ir

The Town of Masoudieh is a neighborhood located in the 15th municipal district of Tehran.

== Population ==
In 2011, Masoudieh had a population of 74,500 people.
